Felipe Ignacio Flores Chandía (born 9 January 1987) is a Chilean footballer who plays for Chilean Primera B side Magallanes as a striker.

Career
He has represented the Chile national team at the U-17, U-20, and professionals levels.  In 2007, he was loaned to O'Higgins in the first semester and Cobreloa in the second semester. Along with Fernando Meneses, Flores was released by Cobreloa prior to the playoffs in December 2007 due to breaking team rules. Coincidentally both players belong to Colo-Colo. He belongs to Colo-Colo where he did not receive many chances with the first team but in the three appearances he had in 2006 he scored one goal.

International goals

Honours

Club
Colo-Colo
 Primera División de Chile (3): 2006 Apertura, 2006 Clausura, 2014 Clausura

References

External links

1987 births
Living people
Footballers from Santiago
Chilean footballers
Chile international footballers
Chile under-20 international footballers
Chile youth international footballers
Chilean expatriate footballers
Colo-Colo footballers
O'Higgins F.C. footballers
Cobreloa footballers
Unión Española footballers
Salamanca F.C. footballers
La Piedad footballers
C.D. Antofagasta footballers
Dorados de Sinaloa footballers
Santiago Morning footballers
Colo-Colo B footballers
Club Tijuana footballers
C.D. Veracruz footballers
A.C. Barnechea footballers
Magallanes footballers
Deportes Magallanes footballers
Chilean Primera División players
Liga MX players
Ascenso MX players
Primera B de Chile players
Segunda División Profesional de Chile players
Expatriate footballers in Mexico
Chilean expatriate sportspeople in Mexico
Association football forwards